John Whitcome Reynolds Sr., (October 1, 1876 – February 4, 1958) was an American lawyer and politician. He was the 26th Attorney General of Wisconsin from 1927 to 1933. He was elected as a Republican.

Biography

Reynolds was born in Jacksonport, in Door County, Wisconsin, the son of Jennie (Foley) and Thomas Reynolds. He graduated from the University of Michigan and the University of Wisconsin Law School. Reynolds was admitted to the bar in 1902. After becoming a lawyer, he worked in Ashland, Wisconsin, for a short time before setting up a practice in Green Bay, Wisconsin, which remained his home for the rest of his life. Reynolds served as district attorney for Brown County from 1906 to 1910. He was a delegate to the 1924 Republican National Convention, supporting Senator Robert M. La Follette.  When La Follette ran for President of the United States as a Progressive in the general election that year, Reynolds was one of thirteen electors who voted for him.

Reynolds was elected attorney general in November 1926, and won re-election in 1928 and 1930.

His son John W. Reynolds Jr. also served as Attorney General and was elected Governor of Wisconsin.

Electoral history

Wisconsin attorney general (1926, 1928, 1930)

| colspan="6" style="text-align:center;background-color: #e9e9e9;"| Primary Election, September 7, 1926

| colspan="6" style="text-align:center;background-color: #e9e9e9;"| General Election, November 2, 1926

| colspan="6" style="text-align:center;background-color: #e9e9e9;"| Primary Election, September 4, 1928

| colspan="6" style="text-align:center;background-color: #e9e9e9;"| General Election, November 6, 1928

| colspan="6" style="text-align:center;background-color: #e9e9e9;"| General Election, April 1930

| colspan="6" style="text-align:center;background-color: #e9e9e9;"| General Election, November 4, 1930

Wisconsin Supreme Court (1930, 1931)

| colspan="6" style="text-align:center;background-color: #e9e9e9;"| General Election, April 1, 1930

| colspan="6" style="text-align:center;background-color: #e9e9e9;"| General Election, April 7, 1931

References

1876 births
1958 deaths
Wisconsin Attorneys General
District attorneys in Wisconsin
People from Door County, Wisconsin
Politicians from Green Bay, Wisconsin
1924 United States presidential electors
University of Wisconsin–Madison alumni
University of Wisconsin Law School alumni
Wisconsin Republicans
University of Michigan alumni